Eduardo Sepúlveda (born 13 June 1991) is an Argentine racing cyclist, who currently rides for UCI ProTeam . He rode at the 2014 UCI Road World Championships.

Early life
Sepúlveda was born in Rawson, the capital of Chubut, in the Patagonia of Argentina. He started to ride a bike under the advice of his father, Eduardo. In 2007, aged 16 years old, Sepúlveda won the Copa Nacional Infanto Juvenil for young riders in Argentina. However, his father was killed in a car accident while returning home after the event.

After a series of good results, in 2012, Sepúlveda was invited for the Union Cycliste Internationale to the World Cycling Centre in Aigle, Switzerland, among many other riders from developing countries, including Natnael Berhane, Youcef Reguigui and Josip Rumac. Also in 2012, he won the silver medal in the individual time trial at the Pan American Road Championships in Mar del Plata, losing out to Magno Nazaret from Brazil.

Professional career
In 2013, Sepúlveda began his career with the French team  and signed an initial two-year contract. In a 2014 interview, Sepúlveda said thanks to the Tour de San Luis for allowing him a chance to train at the World Cycling Centre and to sign with the French second division team .

Sepúlveda took his first professional win in February 2015 with a solo victory in the Classic Sud-Ardèche. Later that year, he took a fine second place in the overall classification of the Tour of Turkey, 32 seconds down on Kristijan Đurasek. He participated in the 2015 Tour de France, but was disqualified on stage 14 for riding in a car instead of pedaling his bike.

For the 2018 season, Sepúlveda joined one of the UCI WorldTeams,  from Spain, and signed a two-year contract, a move predicted for many insiders in the UCI World Tour. In May 2018, he was named in the start list for the Giro d'Italia for the first time in his career.

He was expected to ride the 2019 Vuelta a España but was not selected, and, after this omission, 2019 was the first year in his professional career that Sepúlveda did not ride one Grand Tour.

Major results

2010
 3rd  Individual pursuit, Pan American Track Championships
2011
 3rd  Team pursuit, Pan American Track Championships
 7th Overall Rutas de América
2012
 Pan American Road Championships
1st  Under-23 time trial
2nd  Time trial
 2nd ZLM Tour
 5th Overall Coupe des nations Ville Saguenay
 8th Chrono Champenois
2013
 Pan American Track Championships
1st  Individual pursuit
1st  Team pursuit
2nd  Madison
 6th Overall Kreiz Breizh Elites
 9th Overall Tour du Poitou-Charentes
 10th Time trial, UCI Under-23 Road World Championships
 10th Circuito de Getxo
2014
 4th Overall Tour Méditerranéen
1st  Young rider classification
 5th Overall Critérium International
 6th Overall Tour de San Luis
2015
 1st Classic Sud-Ardèche
 1st Tour du Doubs
 2nd Overall Tour of Turkey
 4th Overall Tour de San Luis
 5th Overall Route du Sud
2016
 2nd Overall Tour de San Luis
1st  Mountains classification
1st Stage 4
 4th Tour du Doubs
2017
 4th Classic Sud-Ardèche
2019
 2nd Overall Tour of Austria
2021
 3rd Overall Tour of Turkey
 4th Overall Tour of Romania
 8th Overall Adriatica Ionica Race
 10th Giro dell'Appennino
2022
 3rd Overall Tour of Turkey
1st Stage 4
 7th Overall Tour de Langkawi
 8th Overall Tour of Antalya

Grand Tour general classification results timeline

References

External links

 

1991 births
Living people
Argentine male cyclists
Cyclists at the 2016 Summer Olympics
Cyclists at the 2020 Summer Olympics
Olympic cyclists of Argentina
Pan American Games bronze medalists for Argentina
Pan American Games medalists in cycling
South American Games bronze medalists for Argentina
South American Games medalists in cycling
Cyclists at the 2011 Pan American Games
Competitors at the 2010 South American Games
People from Rawson, Chubut
Medalists at the 2011 Pan American Games